Sheanon Antoine Williams (born March 17, 1990) is an American soccer player.

Career

College and amateur
Williams attended The Rivers School in Weston, Massachusetts and played club soccer for FC Greater Boston Bolts before being offered a place at the IMG Soccer Academy in Bradenton, Florida in 2005 as a member of the U.S. Under-17 National Team Residency Program. He earned NSCAA/adidas Youth All-America honors in 2006 and 2007, and was named to the 2007 PARADE High School All-America squad.

Williams enrolled at the University of North Carolina in January 2008, and subsequently played one year of college soccer for the Tar Heels, before leaving school a year early to attempt to secure a professional contract in Europe.

Despite performing well on trial with teams such as Vfl Wolfsburg, Williams was unable to secure a contract, and returned to the United States in 2009. He played with the Carolina Dynamo of the USL Premier Development League, earning All-Eastern Conference honors after scoring six goals and 16 points in 12 games.

Professional
After training with Major League Soccer club Real Salt Lake during the latter half of 2009 and early 2010, Williams turned professional in 2010 when he joined the Harrisburg City Islanders in the USL Second Division. He made his professional debut and scored his first professional goal in Harrisburg's opening day 2–2 draw with the Richmond Kickers. After training with the Philadelphia Union, Williams eventually signed with the team in August 2010. In Week 7 of the 2011 MLS season, Williams was named to the MLS Team of the Week for his performance against the San Jose Earthquakes. He again gained Team of the Week honors in Week 16 of the season.

In February 2012, Philadelphia signed Williams to a contract extension through the 2015 season.

In July 2015, Philadelphia traded Williams, along with an international roster slot, to Houston Dynamo in exchange for allocation money and future considerations.

On December 13, 2016 Williams was traded by the Dynamo to the Vancouver Whitecaps FC in exchange for general allocation money. Williams was suspended from the team on June 16, 2017 for an off-field assault earlier in the day, but the charges were stayed three days later.

Williams joined LA Galaxy as a free agent in June 2018. Williams was released by LA Galaxy at the end of their 2018 season.

International
Williams played with the US National U-17 team from 2005 to 2007, and was a member of the United States squad at the 2007 CONCACAF U17 Tournament and the 2007 FIFA U-17 World Cup in Korea. He moved on to play for the US National U-20 team in 2008, and played at the 2009 FIFA U-20 World Cup in Egypt.

Career statistics

Club

References

External links
 
 

1990 births
Living people
American soccer players
Association football defenders
North Carolina Fusion U23 players
Penn FC players
Philadelphia Union players
Houston Dynamo FC players
LA Galaxy players
LA Galaxy II players
Major League Soccer players
North Carolina Tar Heels men's soccer players
Soccer players from Boston
USL Championship players
United States men's under-20 international soccer players
United States men's youth international soccer players
USL League Two players
USL Second Division players
Vancouver Whitecaps FC players